Myas is a genus of beetles in the family Carabidae, containing the following species:

 Myas chalybeus (Palliardi, 1825)
 Myas coracinus (Say, 1823)
 Myas cyanescens Dejean, 1828
 Myas lindrothi (Allen, 1980)

References

Pterostichinae